Mammifrontia is a genus of moths of the family Noctuidae erected by William Barnes and Arthur Ward Lindsey in 1922.

Species
 Mammifrontia leucania Barnes & Benjamin, 1922
 Mammifrontia rileyi Benjamin, 1936
 Mammifrontia sarae Mustelin, 2006

References

Hadeninae